Assaf is a breed of domesticated sheep from Israel. The Assaf sheep is the product of crossbreeding the Awassi and East Friesian.

The Assaf is a dual purpose breed, raised for both milk and meat. Both sexes display white and are unicolored.

See also
Agricultural research in Israel
Sheep husbandry
Agriculture in Israel

References

Sheep breeds
Animal breeds originating in Israel